, son of Nijō Nariyuki, was a Japanese politician who served as a member of House of Peers in the Meiji period. Tamemoto was adopted by Nijō Atsumoto.

References

 

1872 births
1929 deaths
Fujiwara clan
Masamaro